Daojiao fushi, also known as Taoist clothing, are religious clothing and adornment worn by devotees and practitioners of Taoism, an indigenous religion and life philosophy in China. Chinese culture attaches great importance to "cap and gown" are seen as important signs of levels of etiquettes; it is also a visible marker of the Taoist identity. Taoist ritual garments (sometimes referred as daoyi are forms of ritual clothing. These clothing worn by the Taoist priests (called Daoshi) are inherited from the Han Chinese traditional clothing and holds clear Taoist cultural meaning. When performing rituals and important rituals, Taoist priests wear ceremonial attires which appear to be aligned with elements of Chinese cosmology; these ceremonial attires are therefore strong spiritual intermediaries acting on the part of the Taoist devotees community. Different forms of clothing will be worn by Taoist priests in accordance to ritual types and obvious distinctions are found in the attire of Taoist priests based on their different positions to the altar. There were also codes which would stipulate the appropriate Taoist attire to be worn during both ritual performance and when being off duty.

Cultural significance 
Taoist clothing are visible markers of the Taoist identity. The Taoist ritual clothing not only inherit from Han Chinese's Hanfu but also show clear Taoist cultural meaning. The arts found on the clothing are deeply influenced by Chinese culture. They are also typically decorated with designs which reflect traditional Taoist cosmology including Taoist pantheon (e.g. Yudi, the Sanqing, Yuanshi Tianzun, Lingbao Tianzun, Daode Tianzun who is the deified Laozi), the Eight Immortals: the Eight Trigrams, the Twenty-eight Lunar Mansions and the 12 animals of the Chinese zodiac. They can also be decorated with animals which are related to Chinese mythology, legends and stories, such as the crane bird which represents transcendence. They can also be decorated with auspicious symbols, such as dragons, butterflies, bats, clouds.

History

Ancient 
An explanation to the origins of Taoist ritual clothing might be they are derived from robes worn by zhouyi (i.e. ritual healers) and fangshi in ancient China as their clothing were embroidered with patterns of flowing pneuma which are similar to clouds, depictions of the celestial real and the underworld. Another hypothesis is that the Taoist ritual clothing was markers of various ranks of priestly attainments similar to the formal clothing system used in ancient China to identify the members of the nobility and the senior bureaucracy.

According to the Taoist tradition, the ritual clothing originated since the era of Yellow Emperor; according to the legend, one day the Yellow Emperor saw a deity dressed in golden robe adorned with colourful clouds and a golden crown. To thank the deity for protecting the world, the Yellow Emperor designed the Taoist ritual dress based on the deity and reasoned that these heavenly clothing would be the most appropriate attire to wear when approaching the heavens during prayers. Therefore, the Daoshi (Taoist priests) wear the attire of the gods.

Northern and Southern dynasties 
Taoist traditions were systematized during the Six dynasties period. Early taoist clothing were not fully developed and it is the Northern and Southern dynasties that the preliminary Taoist dress code was formed. Since the Liu Song period during the Southern dynasties, Lu Xiujing began to reinterpret the doctrine of Taoist's doctrine of adaptation to the social hierarchical system by basing himself on the ancient Chinese crown and dress system and by combining the religious needs, thus developing a new attire system.This system became the earliest systematic dress code of Taoist clothing. In the Lishizhenxiantidaotongjian 《历世真仙体道通鉴》, it is described that "Xiujing's Taoist dress is very beautiful, like the moon and star, like the rainbow and flower". Since then, the dress code of the Taoist clothing continued to develop until it included different styles, patterns, and colours based on different status and occasions. Many variety of Taoist ritual clothing were also described when Taoist clothing was systematized.

Song dynasty 
There were many forms of Taoist priest clothing in the Song dynasty. In the early Southern Song, a style of Taoist priest robe is described as: "the broader silk braid of the Taoist priest robe was seen as more stylish, with the breadth being about three to four cun, and the length more than two zhang, so that that dress made of silk velvet could be wrapped back and forth around the wearer's waist several times".Another form of Taoist priest was the Hechang (lit. "Crane robe") which was made of twisted and woven feathers; it was a symbolism of immortality and ascendance to the Heaven. Cheng Dachang from the Southern Song dynasty also observed that "[...] the clothes worn by Taoist priests of the current times are slightly different from the fur coat. The lower parts of the fur coat are crossed and overlapped while those of the Taoist priest robe hang straight down". In The Current Regression of Diet and Apparel by Shi Shengzu, it was observed that the "apparel system of the three ancient Chinese dynasties could still be found among Taoist priests".

Daofu are broad and elegant robes, which were initially worn by Taoist priests. In the Song dynasty, the daofu was very popular. It was greatly appreciated by some hermits and scholars during this period and was mentioned in some poems written by Wang Yucheng being described as "the silk wadding cap, coarse clothes and black muslin scarf" and Fan Zhongyan who described the Taoist priests as dressing themselves sprucely. Fan Zhongyan also noted that "gentlemen dressed like them [i.e. Taoist priests] might also live and easy and free life". Some scholars, such Shi Manqing (994–1041), and some officials in retirement also liked to dressed in daofu. There were many forms of daofu in the ancient China.

Qing dynasty 

In the Qing dynasty, Taoist priests wore dark blue robes.

Types of Taoist attire 

The traditional clothing worn by the Taoist community is connected to pre-modern Chinese clothing and styles. 

Nowadays, tradition-based taoists will often wear the traditional robes and liturgical clothing for formal religious and ritual occasions; while Zhengyi priests and taoists priests outside mainland China tend to wear Western clothing in their daily lives. The traditional taoist robes can also be worn as a daily lives clothing by the Quanzhen monastics in mainland China.

Garment 

Taoist priests commonly wear two types of clothing: daopao and jiangyi; these two forms of attire are often decorated with cosmic symbolism in their upper and central back section and often includes elements such as, the sun and moon, mountains and water, etc.

Daofu 
In the Ming dynasty, the daofu is a wide-sleeved, crossed-collar robe which closes to the right and has dark edging at the edges of the collar, sleeves, and placket. In the collar edge, a collar protector known as huling is sometimes inserted. The Ming daofu is similar to the daopao, except for the addition of edges decoration on the robe. Belts like dadai (大带) and sitao (丝绦; i.e. a ribbon or a thin rope made of silk) is also used around the waist when wearing the daofu.

Daopao/ hechang 
Some forms of taoist robes are also referred as crane robes (hechang, 鶴氅). This form of Taoist priests' daopao is not cross collared and instead looks like a beizi in terms of construction and design; a clothing artefact showing this style of daopao is now stored in museums such as the Rhode Island School of Design Museum. Daopao in the form of hechang has been recorded since the Northern Song dynasty. Jin dynasty unearthed artefacts of daopao in the form of hechang have been excavated from a late 12th century tomb of a Taoist named Yan Deyuan, near Datong in Shanxi province; these robes are decorated with cranes, which are associated with the Taoist idea of transcendence since at least the Han dynasty and possibly prior to the Han dynasty. 

The Taoist's priest daopao are commonly worn by the Taoism priests. It is worn by middle-ranks Taoist priests; it is red in colour and has motifs at the back and front, on the sleeves. Theses motifs decorations can include, the bagua and cranes.

Jiangyi 
Jiangyi, also known as "robe of descent" which refers to either the descent of a priest from the altar or of the spirits to the altar, is a common form of Taoist priest's clothing. The jiangyi is a sign of the higher priestly rank and is worn by grandmasters. It was worn at least since the Jin dynasty with unearthed artefacts having been excavated from a late 12th century tomb of a Taoist named Yan Deyuan, near Datong in Shanxi province.

It looks similar to a poncho in structure; when worn, the robes sits squarely on the shoulders of the Taoist' priest; it is usually fastened across the front with 2 silk ties which are sewn just above the waist level. It is made of embroidered silks and is composed of a large square of satin fabric folded into two to form the shoulder line; the shoulder lines continues to the hem of the sleeves. The robe is slashed in the middle to form the collar of the robe. It is typically trimmed with border decorations. Common motifs on the jiangyi include: the sun, moon, Three Heavens, Sacred (Golden) Tower and Flying cranes; Stars and Constellations; Wu yue (True forms of the Five Sacred Peaks); Mountain Peaks and Cosmic waters. The square fabric shape symbolizes the concept of the earth, which is square in Chinese cosmology. When the priests opened his arms, the square silhouette of the jiangyi becomes fully visible and the motifs which typically the heaves became visible; therefore, by wearing the jiangyi, the daoshi embodies the conjunction of heaven and earth. Jiangyi are often found in the five symbolic colours of the universe (i.e. black, red, green, yellow or white).

Daoyi 
The Quanzhen monastic taoist priests and nuns wear a wide-sleeved, cross-collared gown called daoyi (道衣; lit. "robe of the Dao") which closes to the right; it is a standard type of clothing. The sleeves of the daoyi is referred as "cloud sleeves"; they are wide, open at the ends, and their sleeves are so long that it is past the fingers when extended but can be even longer. In the Quanzhen order, the dagua is worn as one of the ordinary clothing while the deluo is a formal clothing.

Deluo 

The deluo (得罗) is a cross-collared gown with large sleeves. It is worn by Taoist priests of the Quanzhen order is a formal ritual dress which is indigo in colour. The blue colour is a symbolism for the east and represents having been descended from the first patriarch of the Quanzhen school, Donghua dijun. In large temples (e.g. Baiyunguan in Beijing), the deluo would be worn by monastics on festival days; the deluo would have wide sleeves which could reach 45 cm.

Daogua 
In the Wengong temple in Hanzhong, the cross-collar daopao is the standard form of attire and is referred as daogua ( depending on context). Their daopao is cross-collared at the front, and the sleeves are so long that only the fingers can escape from the sleeves. It is made of thick garments and is blue or black in colour. 

The daogua can be found in 3 types: dagua (a long cross-collar robe which reaches the ankles and has a 42 cm wide sleeves), zhonggua (中褂; a cross-collar robe which reaches the mid-calf and has slightly narrower sleeves than the dagua), and xiaogua (小褂; a cross-collar robe which reaches the hip and has sleeves which could either be the same size or narrower than a zhongua; the xiaogua is more similar to a jacket than a robe).

Patchwork robes 

Patchwork robes is a form of ritual dress; it is made of various pieces of old clothing sewn together are worn by the Taoist priests of the Quanzhen school of Hong Kong.

Headwear and headdress

Shoes 
Cloud shoes are the shoes worn by the high Taoist priests only. The name of the shoes come from the cloud embroidery patterns fond on the shoes. These shoes are bright red.

See also 

 Hanfu
 List of Hanfu
 Taoism

Notes

References 

Chinese traditional clothing